The Terminal Warehouse Building, also known as Markham Tower East, is a historic commercial building 500 East Markham Street in downtown Little Rock, Arkansas. Occupying a full city block, it is a massive four-story brick building, with a central eight-story tower on its Markham Street facade. Built in 1926, it is despite its utilitarian use (now as a mixed-use space), a fine example of Venetian Gothic architecture, and a reminder of the city's long history as an important transportation hub.

The building was listed on the National Register of Historic Places in 1982.

See also
National Register of Historic Places listings in Little Rock, Arkansas

References

Commercial buildings on the National Register of Historic Places in Arkansas
Buildings and structures in Little Rock, Arkansas
Commercial buildings completed in 1926